Vipera monticola, also known as the Atlas mountain viper, is a viper species endemic to Morocco. Like all other vipers, it is venomous.

Description
Spawls and Branch (1995) describe it as the smallest member of the genus Vipera, reaching a total length of only .

Geographic range
It is found in the High Atlas Mountains, Morocco.

The type locality given is "Haut-Atlas, Massif du Toubkal, Maroc...qu'entre 2.500 et 3.900 m "  [Toubkal Massif, High Atlas Mountains, southwestern Morocco, between 8,200 and 12,800 ft].

Conservation status
This species is classified as Near Threatened (NT) according to the IUCN Red List of Threatened Species (v3.1, 2001). Listed as such because its extent of occurrence is likely not much more than 20,000 km², and the extent and quality of its habitat are probably declining, therefore making the species close to qualifying for Vulnerable. Year assessed: 2005.

References

Further reading
Beerli P, Billing H, Schätti B. 1986. Taxonomisches Status von Vipera latasti monticola Saint Girons, 1953 (Serpentes, Viperidae). Salamandra 22: 101-104.
Klemmer K. 1963. Liste der rezenten Giftschlangen: Elapidae, Hydropheidae, Viperidae und Crotalidae. Marburg: N.G. Elwert. 210 pp.
Saint-Girons H. 1953. Une vipère naine: Vipera latastei montana. Bulletin de la Société Zoologique de France 78: 24-28.
Saint-Girons H. 1954. Note rectificative au sujet de Vipera latastei montana, n. subsp. Bulletin de la Société Zoologique de France 78: 475. (Vipera latastei monticola, replacement name.)

External links
 

monticola
Snakes of Africa
Reptiles of North Africa
Endemic fauna of Morocco
Reptiles described in 1954